In mathematics, in the field of functional analysis, a Minkowski functional (after Hermann Minkowski) or gauge function is a function that recovers a notion of distance on a linear space.

where the infimum of the empty set is defined to be positive infinity  (which is  a real number so that  would then  be real-valued). 
This property of being nonnegative stands in contrast to other classes of functions, such as sublinear functions and real linear functionals, that do allow negative values. 

Moreover,  is also often assumed to have more properties, such as being an absorbing disk in  since these properties guarantee that  will be a (real-valued) seminorm on  
These relationships between seminorms, Minkowski functionals, and absorbing disks is a major reason why Minkowski functionals are studied and used in functional analysis. 
In particular, through these relationships, Minkowski functionals allow one to "translate" certain  properties of a subset of  into certain  properties of a function on

Definition

 
Here,  is shorthand for  

For any   if and only if  is not empty. 
The arithmetic operations on  can be extended to operate on  where  for all non-zero real  
The products  and  remain undefined.

Some conditions making a gauge real-valued

However, in functional analysis  is almost always real-valued (that is, to never take on the value of ), which happens if and only if the set  is non-empty for every  

Characterizations of when  is real-valued are given below.

Motivating examples

Example 1

Consider a normed vector space  with the norm  and let  be the unit ball in  Then for every   Thus the Minkowski functional  is just the norm on  

Example 2

Let  be a vector space without topology with underlying scalar field 
Fix  
Let  be the set 

and let  be the Minkowski functional of  
Then

The function  has the following properties:

It is : 
It is :  for all scalars 
It is :  

This is characteristic of Minkowski functionals defined via "nice" sets. 
There is a one-to-one correspondence between seminorms and the Minkowski functional given by such sets. 
What is meant precisely by "nice" is discussed in the section below.

Notice that, in contrast to a stronger requirement for a norm,  need not imply  
In the above example, one can take a nonzero  from the kernel of  
Consequently, the resulting topology need not be Hausdorff.

Common conditions guaranteeing gauges are seminorms

To guarantee that  it will henceforth be assumed that 

If  is absorbing in  then  is positive homogeneous, meaning that  for all real  where 
If  is a nonnegative real-valued function on  that is positive homogeneous, then the sets  and  satisfy  and  

Gauges of absorbing disks

Arguably the most common requirements placed on a set  to guarantee that  is a seminorm are that  be an absorbing disk in 
Due to how common these assumptions are, the properties of a Minkowski functional  when  is an absorbing disk will now be investigated. 
Since all of the results mentioned above made few (if any) assumptions on  they can be applied in this special case. 

Convexity and subadditivity

A simple geometric argument that shows convexity of  implies subadditivity is as follows. 
Suppose for the moment that  
Then for all   
Therefore,  
By definition of the Minkowski functional  

But the left hand side is  so that 

Since  was arbitrary, it follows that  which is the desired inequality. 
The general case  is obtained after the obvious modification.

Convexity of  together with the initial assumption that the set  is nonempty, implies that  is absorbing.

Balancedness and absolute homogeneity

Notice that  being balanced implies that

Therefore

Algebraic properties

Let  be a real or complex vector space and let  be an absorbing disk in  

 is a seminorm on 
 is a norm on  if and only if  does not contain a non-trivial vector subspace.
 for any scalar 
If  satisfies  then

Topological properties

Assume that  is a (real or complex) topological vector space (TVS) (not necessarily Hausdorff or locally convex) and let  be an absorbing disk in  Then

Importantly, it was  assumed that  was continuous nor was it assumed that  had any topological properties. 

Moreover, the Minkowski functional  is continuous if and only if  is a neighborhood of the origin in  
If  is continuous then

Minimal requirements on the set

This section will investigate the most general case of the gauge of  subset  of  

Properties

All results in this section may be applied to the case where  is an absorbing disk. 

Throughout,  is any subset of 

The proofs of these basic properties are straightforward exercises so only the proofs of the most important statements are given. 

For any real  

so that taking the infimum of both sides shows that 

This proves that Minkowski functionals are strictly positive homogeneous. For  to be well-defined, it is necessary and sufficient that  thus  for all  and all  real  if and only if  is real-valued. 

The hypothesis of statement (7) allows us to conclude that  for all  and all scalars  satisfying  

Examples

If  is a non-empty collection of subsets of  then  for all  where  
 Thus  for all  
 
then  for all 

The following examples show that the containment  could be proper. 

The next example shows that the containment can be proper when  the example may be generalized to any real  
Assuming that  the following example is representative of how it happens that  satisfies  but 

Example: Let  be non-zero and let  so that  and  
From  it follows that  
That  follows from observing that for every   which contains  
Thus  and  
However,  so that  as desired.

Positive homogeneity characterizes Minkowski functionals

The next theorem shows that Minkowski functionals are  those functions  that have a certain purely algebraic property that is commonly encountered. 

If  holds for all  and real  then  so that 

Only (1) implies (3) will be proven because afterwards, the rest of the theorem follows immediately from the basic properties of Minkowski functionals described earlier; properties that will henceforth be used without comment. 
So assume that  is a function such that  for all  and all real  and let  

For all real   so by taking  for instance, it follows that either  or  
Let  
It remains to show that  

It will now be shown that if  or  then  so that in particular, it will follow that  
Now if  then this implies that that  for all real  (since ), which implies that  as desired. 
Similarly, if  then  for all real  which implies that  as desired. 

Recall that just like  the function  satisfies  for all real  
Since   if and only if  so assume without loss of generality that  and it remains to show that  
Since   which implies that  (so in particular,  is guaranteed). 
It remains to show that  which recall happens if and only if  
So assume for the sake of contradiction that  and let  and  be such that  where note that  implies that  
Then  

This theorem can be extended to characterize certain classes of -valued maps (for example, real-valued sublinear functions) in terms of Minkowski functionals. 
For instance, it can be used to describe how every real homogeneous function  (such as linear functionals) can be written in terms of a unique Minkowski functional having a certain property.

Characterizing Minkowski functionals on star sets

Characterizing Minkowski functionals that are seminorms

It is also not assumed that  is balanced (which is a property that  is often required to have); in its place is the weaker condition that  for all scalars  satisfying  
The common requirement that  be convex is also weakened to only requiring that  be convex.

Positive sublinear functions and Minkowski functionals

It may be shown that a real-valued subadditive function  on an arbitrary topological vector space  is continuous at the origin if and only if it is uniformly continuous, where if in addition  is nonnegative, then  is continuous if and only if  is an open neighborhood in  
If  is subadditive and satisfies  then  is continuous if and only if its absolute value  is continuous. 

A positive sublinear function is a nonnegative homogeneous function  that satisfies the triangle inequality. 
It follows immediately from the results below that for such a function  if  then  

Correspondence between open convex sets and positive continuous sublinear functions

Let  be an open convex subset of  
If  then let  and otherwise let  be arbitrary. 
Let  be the Minkowski functional of  where this convex open neighborhood of the origin satisfies  
Then  is a continuous sublinear function on  since  is convex, absorbing, and open (however,  is not necessarily a seminorm since it is not necessarily absolutely homogeneous). 
From the properties of Minkowski functionals, it follows that  so that 
 
Since  this completes the proof.

See also

Notes

References

Further reading

 F. Simeski, A.M.P. Boelens and M. Ihme. Modeling Adsorption in Silica Pores via Minkowski Functionals and Molecular Electrostatic Moments. Energies 13 (22) 5976 (2020). https://doi.org/10.3390/en13225976

Convex analysis
Functional analysis
Hermann Minkowski